This is a list of most influential Greek authors of antiquity (by alphabetic order):

 Aeschines - Rhetorics
 Aeschylus - Tragedy
 Aesop - Fables 
 Alcaeus of Mytilene - Lyric Poetry
 Alcman - Lyric Poetry
 Anacreon - Lyric Poetry
 Anaxagoras - Philosophy
 Anaximander - Philosophy, Mathematics
 Anaximenes - Philosophy, Mathematics
 Andocides - Rhetorics
 Antiphon - Rhetorics
 Apollodorus of Carystus - Comedy
 Aristophanes - Comedy
 Archimedes - Mathematics, Geometry
 Aristotle - Philosophy, Physics, Biology 
 Aratus - Poetry, Astronomy 
 Arrian - History
 Athanasius of Alexandria - Theology
 Bacchylides - Lyric Poetry
 Chionides - Comedy
 Chrysippus - Philosophy
 Claudius Ptolemy - Geography, Astronomy
 Clement of Alexandria - Theology, Philosophy 
 Democritus - Philosophy, Chemistry 
 Demosthenes - Rhetorics, Politics
 Dinarchus - Rhetorics
 Dinon - History
 Diodorus - History
 Diogenes Laërtius - History of Philosophy
 Duris of Samos - History
 Epicurus - Philosophy
 Epimenides of Knossos - Philosophy, Philosophical poetry
 Eubulus (poet) - Comedy
 Euclid of Megara - Mathematics, Geometry
 Euripides - Tragedy
 Evagrius Ponticus - Theology
 Gorgias - Philosophy
 Hegemon of Thasos - Comedy
 Heraclitus - Philosophy
 Herodotus of Halicarnassus - History
 Hesiod - Epic Poetry
 Hippocrates of Cos - Medicine
 Homer - Epic Poetry
 Hypereides - Rhetorics
 Iamblichus - Philosophy
 Ibycus of Rhegium - Lyric Poetry
 Irenaeus - Theology, Philosophy
 Isaeus - Rhetorics, Logography
 Isocrates - Rhetorics
 Justin the Martyr - Theology, Philosophy
 Leucippus - Philosophy, Atomism
 Luke the Evangelist - Theology, Medicine, History
 Lycurgus of Athens - Rhetorics
 Lysias - Logography, Rhetorics 
 Maximus the Confessor - Theology, Philosophy
 Menander - Comedy
 Melissus of Samos - Philosophy
 Nicomachus of Gerasa - Mathematics
 Origen - Theology, Philosophy
 Papias of Hierapolis - Theology
 Parmenides - Philosophy
 Pherecydes of Athens - Mythography, Logography
 Philo of Alexandria - Theology, Philosophy
 Pindar - Lyrical Poetry
 Plato - Philosophy
 Plutarch - History, Biography, Philosophy 
 Posidippus (comic poet) - Comedy
 Protagoras - Philosophy 
 Sappho of Lesbos - Lyric Poetry
 Simonides - Lyric Poetry
 Solon - Politics, Philosophy
 [[Sophocles] - Tragedy
 Stesichorus - Lyric Poetry
 Strattis - Comedy
 Thales of Miletus - Philosophy, Mathematics, Astronomy, Physics
 Theocritus - Bucolic poetry
 Theopompus - History
 Thucydides - History
 Xenarchus of Seleucia - Philosophy, Philology
 Xenophanes- Philosophy, Theology
 Xenophon - History
 Zeno of Citium - Philosophy
 Zeno of Elea - Philosophy

Further reading
 Nisetich, Frank J., Pindar's Victory Songs. Baltimore: Johns Hopkins University Press, 1980: translations and extensive introduction, background and critical apparatus.
 Durant, Will (1926). The Story of Philosophy. Simon & Schuster. .
 Victor Davis Hanson, John Heath, Who Killed Homer: The Demise of Classical Education and the Recovery of Greek Wisdom, Encounter Books, 2001
 The Canadian Museum of Civilization—Greece Secrets of the Past
 Ancient Greece website from the British Museum Economic history of ancient Greece
 The Greek currency history Limenoscope, an ancient Greek ports database
 The Ancient Theatre Archive, Greek and Roman theatre architecture
 Illustrated Greek History—Dr. Janice Siegel, Department of Classics, Hampden-Sydney College, Virginia
 Whitmarsh, Tim (2004). Ancient Greek Literature. Cambridge: Polity Press. .
 Beye, Charles Rowan (1987). Ancient Greek Literature and Society. Ithaca, New York: Cornell University Press. .
 C. A. Trypanis (1981). Greek Poetry from Homer to Seferis. University of Chicago Press.
 Anonymous, 1780. The History and Amours of Rhodope. London: Printed for E.M Diemer.
 John Purkis-The Greek Civilization
 Greek Lyric II: Anacreon, Anacreontea, Choral Lyric from Olympis to Alcman (Loeb Classical Library) translated by David A. Campbell (June 1989) Harvard University Press  (Original Greek with facing page English translations, an excellent starting point for students with a serious interest in ancient lyric poetry.)

Ancient Greek writers
Lists of writers